The Nubian bustard (Neotis nuba) is a species of bird in the bustard family. This is a medium-large bustard found in the sparsely vegetated interface between the southern margins of the Sahara desert and the northern part of the Sahel. It is found in Burkina Faso, Cameroon, Chad, Mali, Mauritania, Niger, Nigeria, and Sudan. Its natural habitats are dry savanna and subtropical or tropical dry shrubland.

Description
It is smaller than the sympatric Arabian bustard, as well as more rufous with a different body shape. Compared to larger bustards the Nubian has a more rounded body, a relatively long, thin neck and a rounded head.

Life history
Observation of breeding has occurred from July to October have been reported across the species' range.

Young birds and eggs are threatened by a wider range of predators, including mammalian carnivores and reptiles.

Conservation
Classified as Near-Threatened by the IUCN, its main threat is habitat loss.

References

 

Nubian bustard
Birds of the Sahel
Near threatened animals
Near threatened biota of Africa
Nubian bustard
Taxonomy articles created by Polbot
Nubian bustard